The Fiat Croma name was used for two distinct large family car by  Fiat, one a five door liftback manufactured and marketed from 1985 to 1996, and after a nine year hiatus, a crossover station wagon manufactured and marketed from 2005 to 2010.

First generation (1985–1996)

The original Croma (Type 154) was a five door notchback liftback styled by Giorgetto Giugiaro of Italdesign using the Type Four platform, cooperatively used with the Saab 9000, Lancia Thema and Alfa Romeo 164. 

Released in December 1985, it was marketed in the large family car segment, replacing the Argenta in the Fiat lineup. The Croma was the first large car produced by Fiat to feature a transverse mounted engine and front wheel drive.

Facelift

The Croma received a light facelift for 1988, first shown in Frankfurt in September 1987. The black plastic between the rear lamps was now ridged rather than smooth, the lower portion of the bumpers were body coloured, and the turn signals received clear glass rather than amber. 

The front appearance received some other light modifications to bring appearance in line with that of the recently introduced Tipo.

A more significant facelift was released in January 1991, with a new front design, including changes to the lights, bumpers grille and sheet metal changes to wings and bonnet. Also in 1991, the direct injected diesel engine was equipped with a variable geometry turbocharger ("VNT"). Another facelift was released in June 1993.

Production ended in December 1996, and Fiat left the large family car segment. The Bravo/Brava based Fiat Marea small family car debuted at the same time as the Croma's cancellation.

Engines
The Croma was available with a variety of petrol and diesel engines, most of the petrol units coming from Fiat's Twin Cam engine family.

The later 2.5 L V6 petrol unit was from Alfa Romeo, but as with the 1.6 L engine it was not available in all markets. The 2.0 CHT was designed specifically to provide low fuel consumption under light and medium loads thanks to two separate inlet manifolds of different diameters.

The Fiat Croma was the first passenger car in the world to have a direct injection Diesel (Turbo D i.d.) engine, going on sale in 1988. The 1.9 L fitted with a turbocharger with direct injection produces .

Diesel engined variants of this car were not marketed in the United Kingdom.

Second generation (2005–2010)

In March 2005, Fiat announced a large crossover wagon with an upright tailgate, reminiscent of that of the Fiat Stilo, resurrecting the Croma nameplate. Giugiaro once again styled the exterior, while the chassis was provided via the short lived link with General Motors.

The new Croma (Type 194) is therefore based on the extended variant of the GM Epsilon platform sharing components with the Opel Vectra, Opel Signum and Saab 9-3. It went on sale in Italy in June 2005. The car was shown in the Geneva Motor Show in 2005.

Unlike the previous model, and aware of its lack of image in the upper market segments, Fiat opted for not developing a standard large family car, but developing a "Comfort Wagon", an automobile with design elements of both estates and large MPVs.

Its height of  falls between the Mitsubishi Grandis and Ford S-Max large MPVs ( and  respectively) and SEAT Altea XL. In February 2007, Fiat UK announced that the Croma would no longer be generally available in the United Kingdom, after less than 900 were sold in 2005.

The car was still offered, but only on special order, with RHD models manufactured to customer specifications. Production of the second generation Croma ceased in the end of 2010 and was replaced by the Dodge-based Fiat Freemont.

Safety
The Croma has seven airbags as standard, including one knee bag for the driver. As standard, the Croma is equipped with anti-lock braking system and electronic brakeforce distribution. It has a five star Euro NCAP crash rating for adult occupant protection:

Facelift

The Croma got a major facelift in November 2007, and was termed the Nuova Croma. A new grille (Bravo look) and rear bumper, as well as some material changes inside are the main differences. Fiat now designates the revised model as "Station Wagon" instead of the previously used term "Comfort Wagon". The Nuova Croma was only sold in mainland Europe, excluding the United Kingdom.

Engines
The Croma, built at Fiat's Cassino factory, had three trim levels and five engine options.

The diesel engines were fitted with a standard six-speed manual gearbox, a six-speed automatic was also available and was standard fitment on the 2.4 engines.

Petrol

Diesel

References

External links

 Fiat Croma EuroNCAP results

Croma
Euro NCAP large family cars
Front-wheel-drive vehicles
Italdesign vehicles
1990s cars
2010s cars
Cars introduced in 1985
Sedans
Crossover sport utility vehicles
Cars discontinued in 2010